Manik Varma is an Indian computer scientist and a senior principal researcher at Microsoft Research India. He also holds an adjunct professor of computer science position at the Indian Institute of Technology Delhi. He completed his undergraduate degree in Physics from St. Stephen’s College, Delhi and was a Rhodes Scholar and earned his PhD from the University of Oxford under the guidance of Andrew Zisserman working on Texture Classification in Computer Vision. He also held a post-doctoral fellowship at Mathematical Sciences Research Institute, Berkeley before joining Microsoft Research.

He currently conducts research in the broad fields on Machine Learning, Computer Vision and Computational Advertising. In 2013, he started and popularized a new area in machine learning called Extreme Classification (also known as Extreme Multi-label Classification). Extreme Classification focuses on Multi-Label Classification at the scale of millions of labels and helps rethink traditional problems of ranking and recommendation. Extreme Classification is thriving in both academia and industry with product integrations in Bing and Amazon. Manik Varma along with his colleagues at MSR India also proposed another paradigm in machine learning called Edge Machine Learning to enable machine learning predictions on tiny IoT devices with as little as 2 KB of RAM assisting in low-energy, low-latency and privacy preserving applications of AI. In the past, he worked on statistical approaches to texture classification, object detection, multiple kernel learning and ranking.

He has been awarded the prestigious Shanti Swarup Bhatnagar Prize for Science and Technology, one of the highest Indian science awards for his contributions to Engineering Sciences in 2019. His research works won the WSDM Best Paper award and BuildSys Best Paper Runner-Up award in 2019. He is also an Elected Fellow of Indian National Academy of Engineering and held the Visiting Miller Professorship at University of California, Berkeley. His professional services include being an associate editor for the IEEE Transactions on Pattern Analysis and Machine Intelligence.

References 

Living people
Computer scientists
Alumni of the University of Oxford
Academic staff of IIT Delhi
University of California, Berkeley people
Year of birth missing (living people)